Love, Mary is a 1985 American made-for-television drama film based on the true story of Dr. Mary Groda-Lewis (portrayed by Kristy McNichol) who achieved a career in family medicine despite a personal struggle with dyslexia. The film originally aired on CBS on 8 October 1985.

Plot
Mary Louise Groda was a lonely and poor child, from a family of poor farm workers in Portland, Oregon. She was in frequent trouble with juvenile authorities, partly because she hated to go to school.

After a number of breaks from juvenile authorities, Mary's good luck ran out. She and another troubled male teen got caught while they were joy-riding with a stolen car that they crashed. That joy-ride and the subsequent crash were enough for the judge hearing Groda's case, who had no choice but to incarcerate Mary.

A social worker took an interest in Mary, who was sixteen years of age by that time, and realized that she struggled with dyslexia. She then helped Mary excel in studies. Mary gained confidence and began to fight back against her impediment, eventually going to college, earning an M.D. degree. She chose the family practice of pediatrics as her medical specialty.

Cast
Kristy McNichol as Mary Groda-Lewis
David Paymer as David Lewis
Piper Laurie as Christine Groda
Rachel Ticotin as Rachel Martin
Lycia Naff as Delia
Romy Windsor as Jeanine
David Faustino as Christopher

See also
List of artistic depictions of dyslexia

References

External links
 TV Reviews: McNichol in 'MARY' on CBS
 

1985 television films
1985 films
1985 drama films
American films based on actual events
Dyslexia in fiction
Films directed by Robert Day
CBS network films
1980s English-language films
American drama television films
1980s American films
English-language drama films